The Mendel Funicular, is a funicular railway in Italy. It connects the Überetsch plateau with the Mendel Pass.

Track 
In the twelve minutes of the journey trains rise .  The whole track is located in a rocky region sometimes covered by a forest, and this needs many bridges and tunnels.

History 
The funicular was planned by Emil Strub as part of a link to connect Bolzano with the Mendel Pass, by linking to the St. Anton terminus of the Überetsch Railway. In 1903 Emperor  Franz Joseph I of Austria opened the line itself after nearly one year of construction.  The line was at the time one of the lengthiest funiculars in Europe.  Until 1934 tourists could use the funicular and some other railways to make a journey around the Mendel.

Today 
Today the line is still working, and often used by tourists to reach the Mendel Pass. In 2004 there was an accident on the funicular, in which a driver lost his life.

See also 
 List of funicular railways

Further reading

External links 
 

Railway lines in Trentino-Alto Adige/Südtirol
Transport in South Tyrol
Funicular railways in Italy
Metre gauge railways in Italy
Nonsberg Group
Railway lines opened in 1903